Farid Zemiti (born 4 January 1961) is an Algerian football manager.

References

1961 births
Living people
Algerian footballers
NA Hussein Dey players
Algerian football managers
NA Hussein Dey managers
MC Alger managers
RC Arbaâ managers
USM Blida managers
USM El Harrach managers
USM Alger managers
Algerian Ligue Professionnelle 1 managers
21st-century Algerian people
Association footballers not categorized by position